In ecology, a halosere is a succession in a saline environment. An example of a halosere is a salt marsh.

In a river estuary, large amounts of silt are deposited by the ebbing tides and inflowing rivers.

The earliest plant colonizers are algae and eel grass, which can tolerate submergence by the tide for most of the 12-hour cycle and which trap mud, causing it to accumulate. Two other colonizers are Salicornia and Spartina, which are halophytes, i.e. plants that can tolerate saline conditions. They grow on the inter-tidal mudflats with a maximum of four hours' exposure to air every 12 hours.

Spartina has long roots enabling it to trap more mud than the initial colonizing plants and Salicornia, and so on. In most places this becomes dominant vegetation. The initial tidal flats receive new sediments daily, are waterlogged to the exclusion of oxygen, and have a high pH value.

The sward zone, in contrast, is inhabited by plants that can only tolerate a maximum of four hours submergence every day (24 hours). The dominant species there are sea lavender and other numerous types of grasses.

However, although the vegetation there tends to form a thick mat, it is not continuous. Hollows may remain where the seawater becomes trapped leaving, after evaporation, saltpans in which the  salinity is too great for plants. As the tide ebbs, water draining off the land may be concentrated into creeks.

See also

 Seral community

References

 https://www.biology-fieldwork.org/a-level/succession/saltmarsh/
 https://www.definitions.net/definition/HALOSERE
 https://prezi.com/yuksgcie0ccr/succession-in-a-halosere/
 https://www.tutor2u.net/geography/reference/halosere-succession

External links
 Succession and Seral Stages

Ecological succession
Wetlands
Estuaries